The Mocoví  are an indigenous people of the Gran Chaco region of South America.

Mocoví may also refer to:

The Mocoví language